Sui Mingtai (born September 1942) is a general in the People's Liberation Army of China. He was a member of the 15th and 16th Central Committee of the Chinese Communist Party. He was a member of the Standing Committee of the 11th National People's Congress.

Biography
Sui was born in Zhaoyuan County (now Zhaoyuan), Shandong, in September 1942. He graduated from the PLA Military and Political University and PLA National Defence University.

He enlisted in the People's Liberation Army (PLA) in August 1960, and joined the Chinese Communist Party (CCP) in July 1962. He served in the PLA Engineering Corps from 1960 to 1982. He served as deputy political commissar of the PLA Second Artillery Corps Base in 1983, and five years later promoted to the political commissar position. In June 1990, he became deputy director of its Political Department, rising to director in December 1994. In November 1997, he was promoted to become political commissar of the PLA Second Artillery Corps, a position he held until December 2003, when he was chosen as political commissar of the People's Armed Police. In March 2008, he took office as vice chairperson of the National People's Congress Supervisory and Judicial Affairs Committee.

He was promoted to the rank of major general (shaojiang) in September 1988, lieutenant general (zhongjiang) in July 1996, and general (shangjiang) in 2004.

References

1942 births
Living people
People from Zhaoyuan, Shandong
PLA National Defence University alumni
People's Liberation Army generals from Shandong
People's Republic of China politicians from Shandong
Chinese Communist Party politicians from Shandong
Members of the 15th Central Committee of the Chinese Communist Party
Members of the 16th Central Committee of the Chinese Communist Party
Members of the Standing Committee of the 11th National People's Congress